Leptospermum maxwellii is a species of often low-growing shrub that is endemic to Western Australia. It has thin, flaking bark, egg-shaped leaves, white flowers arranged singly on short side shoots and fruit with the remains of the sepals attached.

Description
The flowers are white and are usually borne in pairs on short side shoots. There are reddish brown bracts and bracteoles at the base of the buds but that are shed early in the flower's development.

Taxonomy and naming
Leptospermum maxwellii was first formally described in 1920 by Spencer Le Marchant Moore and the description was published in The Journal of the Linnean Society, Botany from specimens collected by George Maxwell near the Fitzgerald River. The specific epithet (maxwellii) honours the collector of the type specimens.

Distribution and habitat
This tea tree grows on stony ridges in sandy soils over granite or laterite, in the Esperance Plains and Mallee biogeographic regions.

References

maxwellii
Flora of Western Australia
Plants described in 1920